Free! is an anime series produced by Kyoto Animation and Animation Do centered on the fictional Iwatobi High School Swim Club, with its first season premiering in 2013. Music for the series is published by Lantis. Since the series' premiere, the show has released 3 extended plays, 7 soundtrack albums, 6 audio drama albums, and 7 radio albums. In addition, 23 singles (8 A-side and 15 character) were released for the series.

The soundtrack is primarily composed by Tatsuya Kato. The show's opening theme songs were performed by Oldcodex. The ending theme songs were performed by Style Five, a tie-in group consisting of Nobunaga Shimazaki, Tatsuhisa Suzuki, Tsubasa Yonaga, Daisuke Hirakawa, and Mamoru Miyano, the voice actors for the main characters of the show (respectively Haruka, Makoto, Nagisa, Rei, and Rin).

Albums

Extended plays

Soundtrack albums

Audio drama albums

Radio albums

Singles

A-side singles

Character singles

Other charted songs

Notes

References 

Anime soundtracks
Film and television discographies